is a 1983 Japanese film directed by Yasuo Furuhata.

Cast
 Ken Takakura : Tōno Eiji
 Reiko Ohara : Kamiya Sayo
 Tokiko Kato : Shigeko
 Kunie Tanaka : Iwashita Yoshiharu
 Juzo Itami : Kawahara
 Hideji Ōtaki : Aiba
 Naomi Chiaki : Mineko
 Kei Satō : Yoshino Kozo
 Mako Ishino : 
 Masao Komatsu : Akimoto
 Ryo Ikebe : Horie
 Nenji Kobayashi : Detective Ozeki
 Tetsuya Takeda
 Haruomi Hosono : Sano
 Eiji Bandō
 Eijiro Tono : Matsukawa

Awards and nominations
26th Blue Ribbon Awards
 Won: Best Supporting Actor - Kunie Tanaka
8th Hochi Film Award 
 Won: Best Supporting Actor - Juzo Itami

References

1983 films
Films directed by Yasuo Furuhata
1980s Japanese-language films
Films set in restaurants
Films set in Hokkaido
1980s Japanese films